Amsterdam Bijlmer ArenA (abbreviation: Asb), previously named Amsterdam Bijlmer (1971–2006), is a railway station in the Bijlmermeer neighbourhood of stadsdeel (borough) Amsterdam-Zuidoost in Amsterdam, Netherlands. The station has five platforms and eight tracks; two for the Amsterdam Metro and six train tracks, along with a bus station. Train services are operated by Nederlandse Spoorwegen.

History
Originally opened on 24 May 1971, the station has been rebuilt twice. In July 2007, a large part of the rebuilding was completed and on 17 November 2007 the station was fully opened. The new station was designed by Grimshaw Architects of London in association with Arcadis Architecten.

The station arches over the ArenA Boulevard. It is mostly transparent, to blend in with the rest of the Boulevard.

The metro lines that stop at this station are Metroline 54 (Amsterdam Centraal – Gein) and Metroline 50 (Isolatorweg – Gein).

On 10 December 2006 the station's name was changed from Amsterdam Bijlmer to Amsterdam Bijlmer ArenA, to match its location (ArenA Boulevard), named after the nearby Amsterdam ArenA stadium (since 2018 known as the Johan Cruyff Arena), home of AFC Ajax. On the west side is AFAS Live and Pathé ArenA cinema with 14 screens and the newly built event venue Ziggo Dome. On the east side is Amsterdamse Poort.

Train services
The station is served by the following service(s):

2x per hour intercity service Schiphol – Utrecht – Arnhem – Nijmegen
2x per hour intercity service Schiphol – Utrecht – Eindhoven – Venlo
2x per hour local service (sprinter) Uitgeest – Amsterdam – Breukelen – Woerden – Rotterdam
2x per hour local service (sprinter) Uitgeest – Amsterdam – Breukelen – Utrecht – Rhenen (Peak hours only)
2x day night service ("Nachtnet") Rotterdam - Delft - (Gouda) - The Hague - Leiden - Schiphol Airport - Amsterdam central station - Amsterdam Bijlmer ArenA - Utrecht

Metro services

Metro services are provided by the GVB.
Line 50, the Ring Line runs between Isolatorweg and Gein.
Line 54 the Gein Line runs between Centraal Station and Gein.
Both lines generally run a 10-minute service from around 05:00 – 00:40. At weekends the service starts later and usually runs every 15 minutes.

Platform use

Bus services

City bus services
These services are operated by GVB.

44 Bijlmer ArenA – Bijlmermeer – Diemen-Zuid – Diemen – Diemen Noord
47 Bijlmer ArenA – Bijlmermeer – Gaasperplas – Gaasperdam – Holendrecht
49 Bijlmer ArenA – Karspeldreef – Gaasperplas – Driemond – Weesp railway station
66 Bijlmer ArenA – Bijlmermeer – Diemen - IJburg

Regional services

120 Bijlmer ArenA – Holendrecht – Abcoude – Baambrugge – Loenen a/d Vecht – Breukelen – Maarssen – Utrecht Zuilen – Utrecht Centraal
126 Bijlmer ArenA – Holendrecht – Vinkeveen – Wilnis – Mijdrecht
171 Bijlmer ArenA – Ouderkerk a/d Amstel – Amstelveen Busstation – Bovenkerk – Oranjewijk – Aalsmeer
202 Bijlmer ArenA – Bijlmermeer – Naarden - Muiden P&R – Laren - Blaricum Hospital - Eemnes (Rush hour only)
255 Bijlmer ArenA - Haarlem (Rush hours only express service)
271 Bijlmer Arena - Aalsmeer bloemenveiling (aalsmeer flower auction)
300 Bijlmer ArenA – Ouderkerk a/d Amstel – Amstelveen Oranjebaan – Amstelveen Busstation – Schiphol Airport – Hoofddorp – Haarlem
323 Bijlmer Arena - Muiden P&R - Almere Poort - Almere 't oor - Almere Parkwijk
328 Bijlmer ArenA - Muiden P&R - Almere 't oor - Almere Haven
356 Bijlmer ArenA - Ouderkerk a/d Amstel - Amstelveen Ouderkerkerlaan - Amstelveen Busstation - Schiphol airport North - Badhoevedorp - Haarlem
375 Holendrecht - Bijlmer ArenA - Diemen - Watergang - Ilpendam - Purmerend Weidevenne
376 Holendrecht - Bijlmer ArenA - Diemen - Watergang - Ilpendam - Purmerend De Gors - Purmerend Overwhere - Purmerend M.L. Kingweg
377 Holendrecht - Bijlmer ArenA - Diemen - Watergang - Ilpendam - Purmerend De Purmer-Zuid - Purmerend De Purmer-West - Purmerend De Purmer-Noord - Purmerend Korenstraat
378 Holendrecht - Bijlmer ArenA - Diemen - Broek in waterland - Monnickendam - Volendam - Edam
379 Holendrecht - Bijlmer ArenA - Diemen - Broek in Waterland - Monnickendam Bernhardbrug - Edam Busstation - Scharwoude - Hoorn

Busses 171, 255, 300 and 356 are operated by Connexxion

Busses 120, 126, 323, 324 and 328 are operated by Keolis

Busses 375, 376, 377, 378 and 379 are operated by EBS

Services 255, 300, 323, 324, 328, 375, 376, 377, 378 and 379 are part of the R-net network.

Gallery

References

External links

 Amsterdam Bijlmer ArenA station, station information

1971 establishments in the Netherlands
Bijlmer ArenA
Amsterdam-Zuidoost
Nicholas Grimshaw buildings
Bijlmer ArenA
Railway stations on the Rhijnspoorweg
Railway stations opened in 1971
Railway stations in the Netherlands opened in the 20th century